Federal University of Technology Minna (FUTMINNA) is a Federal Government owned University located in Minna, Nigeria.

FUT MINNA specializes in technological education. Offering Bachelor's of Technology, Master's of Technology in various technology inclined field. The university is a designated Centre of Excellence in Biotechnology and Genetic Engineering and has a core competence in the development of vaccines and drugs, also small arms design in partnership with the Armed Forces of Nigeria 

FUT MINNA was founded in 1983, and the first Vice-Chancellor was Professor J.O. Ndagi who served from 1983 to 1990. The governing bodies are the Council and the Senate. In the beginning, the university took over the facilities of the former Government Teachers' College Bosso, for use permanently. This site now serves as the Bosso Campus of the university. The main campus Gidan Kwano which is sited on 10,650 hectares of land is located along the Minna - Kataeregi - Bida Road. The institution is listed in the Guide to Higher Education in Africa, Association of African Universities and the International Association of Universities, 1999.

Library 
The University Library was established in 1984 and is known as Ibrahim Badamasi Babangidan is the amin library that serve all campuses. the library is subscribed to many data bases with over 80000 collections of printed books, journals and other materials to enhance teaching, learning and research of the university community. information technology service unit has over 350 computers with internet connectivity that provide access to electronics resources. the present University Librarian is Dr. Katamba Abubakar Saka the main library has the following units:

 Circulation Unit
 Serial unit
 Government  document unit
 Thesis unit
 E-Library unit
 digital Library
 Reprographic units

The branch library is located in Bosso Campus for supporting services such as Reference service and the library is called Auwal Ibrahim Library. All these units are grouped into three department for effective services.

Faculties

As of 2018 the university has 10 schools (faculties):

 School of Agriculture and Agriculture Technology.
 School of Electrical Engineering and Technology.
School of Infrastructure, Process Engineering and Technology.
 School of Innovative Technology. Formerly, School of Entrepreneurship and Management Technology.
 School of Environmental Technology.
 School of Life Sciences.
 School of Physical Sciences.
 School of Information and Communication Technology.
 School of Science and Technology Education.
 School of Post Graduate Studies.

Centres 
Centre for preliminary and Extra Mural Studies (CPES)
Centre of Excellence in Disaster Risk Management and Developmental Studies, operated by the National Emergency Management Agency (NEMA).
Centre for Climate Change and Freshwater Resources, which is associated to the Federal Ministry of Environment, a node of the Global Institute for Bio Exploration (Rutgers University, NJ, USA) 
Centre for Human Settlements and Urban Development (CHSUD) associated with the UN Human Settlements programme.
Directorate of Research and Development (DRID).
Centre for Genetic Engineering and Biotechnology (CGEB).
Centre for Open Distance and e-Learning (CODeL).
West African Service Centre on Climate Change and Adapter Land Use (WASCAL).
Africa Centre of Excellence for Mycotoxin and Food Safety

Affiliations
Federal College of Education (Technical) Akoka, Lagos State, Nigeria
Federal Polytechnic Offa, Kwara State, Nigeria.

Recreation and sports 
As part of its overall fitness program, the university includes a floodlit sports arena on both campuses, athletics cinder tracks, badminton indoor courts, basketball courts, table tennis facilities, volleyball courts, football pitches, a fitness gymnasium, extensive pedestrian walkways, a 9-hole golf course and a student recreation centre.

The student-run radio station Search FM 92.3 Campus radio started official transmission in August, 2010. Unfortunately, the radio station was gutted by fire in 2013. As of now, the radio station has a new building and a fully equipped studio which was commissioned in 2014 by the VC.

Vice-Chancellors 

 Prof. Jonathan O. Ndagi (1983-1990)
 Prof. Suleyman O. Adeyemi (1990-1994)
 Prof. Ibrahim H. Umar (1994-1997)
 Prof. Muhammad A. Daniyan (1997-2002)
 Prof. Hamman Sa'ad (2002-2007)
 Prof. Muhammed S. Audu (2007-2012)
 Prof. Musbau A. Akanji (2012-2017)
 Prof. Abdullahi Bala (2017-2022)
 Prof. Faruk Adamu Kuta (2022 - till date)

Notable alumni
Daniel Etim Effiong, Actor, filmmaker
Kemi Adesoye, Screenwriter
Michael Akanji, Sexual Health and Rights Advocate

References

External links

 
Technological universities in Nigeria
Education in Niger State
1983 establishments in Nigeria
Educational institutions established in 1983
Federal universities of Nigeria